The Chicago Department of Public Health (CDPH) is a government department of the City of Chicago. The purpose of the Chicago Department of Public Health (CDPH) is too create a thriving and healthy community within the city of Chicago, Illinois by providing guidance, services and strategies. This includes promoting values of diversity, excellence, informed decision making, and teamwork within all residents and smaller communities within the city.

History
The Chicago Department of Public Health was established in a 1876 reorganization of the city's health apparatus.

In 1975, the Chicago City Council revised the city's municipal code to make it clear that the nine-member Chicago Board of Health was the policy-making body for health and the Chicago Department of Health is the agency which administers the city's health programs and enforces regulations. Previously, when the Board of Health and Department of Public Health had both been under the leadership of Herman Bundesen, many of their functions merged. This 1976 change to the municipal code reverted that.

The Department participated in a series of pandemic preparedness exercises called Crimson Contagion, taking place between August 13 and 16, 2019.

Leadership 
 Allison Arwady, M.D., M.P.H. is the Commissioner of the Chicago Department of Public Health.
 Janet Lin, M.D. is the President of the Chicago Board of Health.

Services and programs

Healthy Chicago 2025 
On September 17, 2020 Mayor Lori Lightfoot and Commissioner Allison Arwady, M.D. launched Healthy Chicago 2025. This is Chicago’s five-year community health improvement plan that focuses on racial and health equity to meet the goal of reducing the Black-white life expectancy gap.

Healthy Chicago 2.0 
In 2016, Mayor Rahm Emanuel and Commissioner Julie Morita, M.D. launched Healthy Chicago 2.0, a plan focused on community collaboration and health equity. Healthy Chicago 2.0 plan outlines 82 objectives and over 200 strategies to help reach 30 goals. In order to measure progress towards each goal, the Chicago Department of Public Health and community partners identified 75 indicators to serve as annual benchmarks towards 2020 targets that are posted on the Chicago Health Atlas addressing the following 10 areas:
Expanding Partnership and Community Engagement
Addressing Root Causes of Health (economic development, built environment, transportation, climate change, and housing)
Addressing Education
Increasing Access to Health and Human Services 
Promoting Behavioral Health
Strengthening Child & Adolescent Health
Preventing and Controlling Chronic Disease
Reducing the Burden of Infectious Disease
Reducing Violence 
Utilizing and Maximizing Data and Research

Healthy Chicago 
On August 16, 2011, Mayor Rahm Emanuel and Commissioner Bechara Choucair, M.D. unveiled the Healthy Chicago public health agenda with the Chicago Department of Public Health. Healthy Chicago identifies 16 health outcome targets and 12 key priority areas and over 200 supporting strategies including:
 Tobacco Use
 Obesity Prevention
 HIV Prevention
 Adolescent Health
 Cancer Disparities
 Heart Disease & Stroke
 Access to Care
 Healthy Mothers & Babies
 Communicable Disease Control & Prevention
 Healthy Homes
 Violence Prevention
 Public Health Infrastructure

References 

Government of Chicago
Health departments in the United States
Medical and health organizations based in Illinois
1876 establishments in Illinois